Mahabad (also Romanized as Mahābād; also known as Mahbād) is a city in the Central District of Ardestan County, Isfahan Province, Iran. At the 2006 census, its population was 4,081, in 1,059 families.

References

Populated places in Ardestan County

Cities in Isfahan Province